Panjera is a historic town in Kotli District in Azad Kashmir.

Populated places in Kotli District